Zikmund Schul (11 January 1916 – 2 June 1944) was a German Jewish composer.

Life 
Schul was born in Chemnitz, Germany, into an Eastern European Jewish family, and grew up in Kassel. Only little is known about his life. He moved to Prague in 1933. In 1937 he started to study composition in Prague, where he was a pupil of Alois Hába. During his time in Prague he became a friend of Viktor Ullmann. In Prague he started also to archive a collection of synagogal-songs from the synagogue of Prague (under the direction of Salomon Lieben). Schul married Olga Stern in 1941, and both were deported to Terezin on 30 November 1941. Schul died in Theresienstadt concentration camp from tuberculosis.

Worklist

Literature 
 Initiative Hans Krása in Hamburg, Germany: Komponisten in Theresienstadt

Recordings 
 Chassidische Tänze Op. 15 – Ensemble Alraune; Cd Novantiqua
 Chassidische Tänze Op. 15 – Julia Rebekka Adler, viola Thomas Ruge, cello; Cd NEOS Music
 Die Nischt-Gewesenen – Wolfgang Holzmair, baritone, Russell Ryan, piano; Bridge Records
The whole music written in Concentration Camps are contained in the CD-Encyclopedia KZ MUSIK created by Francesco Lotoro

References

External links 
Meet ... German "Terezín" composer Zikmund Schul
Music and the Holocaust: Zikmund Schul by David Bloch

1916 births
1944 deaths
20th-century classical composers
20th-century German composers
20th-century German male musicians
20th-century deaths from tuberculosis
German classical composers
German male classical composers
Jewish composers
People from Chemnitz
German people who died in the Theresienstadt Ghetto
Tuberculosis deaths in the Czech Republic
Tuberculosis deaths in Czechoslovakia